The Central League was a minor league baseball league that operated sporadically from 1903–1917, 1920–1922, 1926, 1928–1930, 1934, and 1948–1951.  In 1926, the league merged mid-season with the Michigan State League and played under that name for the remainder of the season. The Central League later reformed in 1928.

Minor League class history

Before the current minor league baseball classification system was introduced in 1963, minor leagues/teams were classified from Class D up to Class Triple-A. The following is a list of the various classifications that the Central League had during its years of operation:

 Class B: 1903–1917, 1920–1922, 1928–1930, 1932, 1934
 Class C: 1926
 Class A: 1948–1951

Cities represented
The following are former cities and teams that made up the Central League.

Akron, Ohio: Akron Rubbermen 1912; Akron Tyrites 1928–1929, 1932
Anderson, IN: Anderson Orphans 1903
Bloomington, IL: Bloomington Blues 1900 
Canton, Ohio: Canton Red Stockings 1905; Canton Chinamen 1906–1907; Canton Statesmen 1912; Canton Terriers 1928–1930, 1932
Charleston, WV: Charleston Senators 1949–1951
 Danville, IL: Danville Champions 1900
Dayton, Ohio: Dayton Veterans 1903–1917; Dayton Aviators 1928–1930; Dayton Ducks 1932; Dayton Indians 1948–1951
Decatur, IL: Decatur Commodores 1900
Erie, PA: Erie Sailors 1912, 1915, 1928–1930, 1932
Evansville, IN: Evansville River Rats 1903–1910, 1913–1915; Evansville Strikers 1911; Evansville Evas 1916–1917
Flint, MI: Flint Arrows, 1948–1951
Fort Wayne, IN: Fort Wayne Railroaders 1903, 1905; Fort Wayne Billikens 1908–1910; Fort Wayne Brakies 1911; Fort Wayne Railroaders 1912, Fort Wayne Champs 1913; Fort Wayne Railroaders 1914; Fort Wayne Cubs 1915; Fort Wayne Chiefs 1928–1930, 1932, 1934; Fort Wayne Generals 1948
Grand Rapids, MI: Grand Rapids Orphans 1903–1905; Grand Rapids Wolverines 1906–1909; Grand Rapids Raiders 1910 Grand Rapids Furniture Makers 1911; Grand Rapids Grads 1911; Grand Rapids Bill-eds 1913; Grand Rapids Black Sox 1912, Grand Rapids Champs 1914 Grand Rapids Black Sox 1915–1917; Grand Rapids Joshers 1920–1921; Grand Rapids Billbobs 1922; Grand Rapids Black Sox 1926; Grand Rapids Tigers 1934; Grand Rapids Jets 1948–1951
Ionia, MI: Ionia Mayors 1921–1922
Jackson, MI: Jackson Mayors 1921
Jacksonville, IL: Jacksonville Reds 1900
Kalamazoo, MI: Kalamazoo Celery Pickers 1920–1922, 1926
Lansing, MI: Lansing Senators 1921–1922
Lima, OH: Lima Buckeyes 1934
Lansing, MI: Ludington Mariners 1920–1922
Ludington, MI: Ludington Tars 1926
Marion, OH: Marion Oilworkers 1903–1904
Muskegon, MI: Muskegon Reds 1916; Muskegon Muskies 1920–1922; Muskegon Reds 1926, 1934; Muskegon Clippers 1948–1950; Muskegon Reds 1951
Newark, Ohio: Newark Skeeters 1911
Peoria, IL: Peoria Distillers 1900, 1904, 1917; Peoria Tractors 1934
Richmond, IN: Richmond Quakers 1917; Richmond Roses 1930
Saginaw, MI: Saginaw Bears 1948-1950; Saginaw Jacks 1951
South Bend, IN: South Bend Greens 1903–1909 South Bend Bronchos 1910; South Bend Bux 1911; South Bend Benders 1911, South Bend Benders 1912, 1916–1917; South Bend Twins 1932
Springfield, IL: Springfield 1900; Springfield Red Birds 1934
Springfield, Ohio: Springfield Babes 1905-1907; Springfield Reapers 1912–1914, 1916–1917; Springfield Buckeyes 1928; Springfield Dunnmen 1929; Springfield Blue Sox 1930
Terre Haute, IN: Terre Haute Hottentots 1900, 1903–1909; Terre Haute Stags 1910; Terre Haute Miners 1911; Terre Haute Terre-iers 1912–1914; Terre Haute Highlanders 1915–1916
Wheeling, WV: Wheeling Stogies 1903–1912, 1915–1916
Youngstown, Ohio: Youngstown Steelmen 1912; Youngstown Buckeyes 1932
Zanesville, Ohio: Zanesville Infants 1908–1909; Zanesville Potters 1910–1912

Standings & statistics

1948-1951
 Playoffs: Fort Wayne 3 games, Flint 2; Dayton 3 games, Muskegon 1 Finals: Dayton 4 games, Fort Wayne 2 

 Playoffs: Charleston 3 games, Dayton 1; Grand Rapids 3 games, Flint 2 Finals: Grand Rapids 4 games, Charleston 2 
 

 Playoffs: Flint 3 games, Grand Rapids 1; Muskegon 3 games, Dayton 2 Finals: Flint 4 games, Muskegon 1

References

External links
https://web.archive.org/web/20071022210728/http://www.ballparkdigest.com/leagues/central_league.htm

Defunct minor baseball leagues in the United States
Baseball leagues in Ohio
Baseball leagues in Indiana
Baseball leagues in Illinois
Baseball leagues in Michigan
Baseball leagues in West Virginia
Sports leagues established in 1900
Sports leagues disestablished in 1951